The Bracknell Hornets is an ice hockey team from Bracknell, Berkshire, who play in the NIHL South Division 1. In 2009/10 they won the league playoffs.

History

Bracknell have been a part of the ENL since its creation in the 2000/2001 season playing at "The Hive" (the nickname for the John Nike Leisuresport Complex), and traditionally play their home games on Saturdays.

The team is run under the banner of the Bracknell Ice Hockey Club, the Hornets being their senior team with the aim of encouraging junior players to progress through the ranks.

In recent times strong links have been forged with the Bracknell Bees with players on 2 way contracts between the 2 clubs.

Club roster 2020–21

2020/21 Outgoing

External links
Official website

Ice hockey teams in England
Sport in Bracknell